André Bervil (1905–1972) was a French stage and film actor. He was married to the actress Suzanne Grey, and was son-in-law of Denise Grey.

Selected filmography
 My Little Marquise (1937)
 Happy Days (1941)
 Bolero (1942)
 Mademoiselle X (1945)
 The Temptation of Barbizon (1946)
 Gringalet (1946)
 The Mysterious Monsieur Sylvain (1947)
 The Seventh Door (1947)
 Keep an Eye on Amelia (1949)
 At the Grand Balcony (1949)
 The Cupid Club (1949)
 Madame du Barry (1954)
 Les Truands (1956)
 The Hole (1960)

References

Bibliography
 Maurice Bessy. Histoire du cinéma français: 1951-1955. Pygmalion, 1989.

External links

1905 births
1972 deaths
French male film actors
French male stage actors
Male actors from Paris